Susan Candace Petrey (7 April 1945 – 5 December 1980) was an American writer of fantasy short fiction.

Biography
Born in Seattle, Petrey worked as a medical technologist after obtaining a degree in microbiology. Most of her writing took place in a setting involving "gentle healing vampires", the "Varkela". Only three of her stories were professionally published during her lifetime. More of her work appeared in the posthumous collection Gifts of Blood (1990). In 1981, she was nominated, also posthumously, for the John W. Campbell Award for Best New Writer, and her story "Spidersong" was nominated for the Hugo Award.

Petrey was active in the Portland, Oregon science fiction fandom. A group of her friends established the Susan C. Petrey Clarion Scholarship Fund in her memory. The fund annually raises money to send aspiring writers to the Clarion Workshop.

References

External links

1945 births
1980 deaths
American science fiction writers
American women short story writers
Writers from Seattle
20th-century American women